František Tikal (18 July 1933 – 10 August 2008) was a Czechoslovak ice hockey defenseman. He played 17 seasons in the Czechoslovak Extraliga for HC Sparta Praha and won two national titles. Internationally  he played 59 games for Czechoslovakia, including 15 at the 1960 and 1964 Winter Olympics, and earned an Olympic bronze medal in 1964, placing fourth in 1960. He was named the best defender of the tournament at the 1964 Olympics and 1965 World Championships. At the 1960 Games he played one game against his brother Zdeněk, who fled to Australia in 1948. In 2004 Tikal was inducted into the International Ice Hockey Federation Hall of Fame.

References

External links

 HC Sparta Praha profile 
 

1933 births
2008 deaths
ATSE Graz players
Czechoslovak ice hockey defencemen
HC Sparta Praha players
Ice hockey players at the 1960 Winter Olympics
Ice hockey players at the 1964 Winter Olympics
IIHF Hall of Fame inductees
Olympic bronze medalists for Czechoslovakia
Olympic ice hockey players of Czechoslovakia
Olympic medalists in ice hockey
People from České Budějovice District
Medalists at the 1964 Winter Olympics
Sportspeople from the South Bohemian Region
Czech ice hockey defencemen
Czechoslovak expatriate sportspeople in Austria
Czechoslovak expatriate ice hockey people
Expatriate ice hockey players in Austria